George Allan may refer to:

Politics and law
 George Allan (antiquary) (1736–1800), English antiquary and attorney
 George Allan (barrister) (1767–1828), English politician, son of the antiquary
 George William Allan (1822–1901), Canadian politician
 George William Allan (Manitoba politician) (1860–1940), Canadian politician

Others
 George Allan (cricketer) (1887–1932), Australian cricketer
 George Allan (footballer, born 1875) (1875–1899), Scottish footballer (Liverpool FC, Celtic, national team)
 George Allan (footballer, born 1885) (1885–1916), Scottish footballer (Partick Thistle, Ayr United)
 George Allan (footballer, born unknown) (fl. 1890s), Scottish footballer
 George Allan (composer) (1864–1930), composer and arranger of music for brass bands

See also
 George Allen (disambiguation)